The Rascals, Rogues, and Rapscallions is a cigar-friendly men's fraternal society devoted to scholarly research on obscure topics. Dubbed "America's Most Interesting Men's Club", the RR&R meets for quarterly dinner meetings at which one or more members of the society present findings on either their current research projects, or a topic that had been assigned to them by the group.

Beginnings, organization and membership

The society, which first met on February 3, 1989 at Harvey's Chelsea Restaurant in New York City, is organized into chapters called "Lairs." Lairs have been organized in Pittsburgh, Pennsylvania, Roanoke, Virginia, and Doylestown, Pennsylvania. Lairs officers include: Director, Assistant Director, Secretary, Treasurer, Keeper of the Humidor, and Archivist. Coordinating the work of the RR&R at a national level and acting as the society's Board of Trustees is the Ephorate, a council comprising three  Ephors, a constitutional office found in ancient Sparta.

Members are organized into four ranks: Postulates, Rascals, Rogues, and Rapscallions. A man joins the society at the rank of Postulate. Upon completing in one “Mass Challenge” and one “Research Report” within two years, the Postulate is elevated to Rascal and receives from the Lair his "Rascal Challenge," a specific research topic on which he is challenged to discover interesting and important results. Upon his presentation of his "Rascal Challenge" report at a regular meeting of the Lair, the Rascal is elevated to Rogue and receives a "Rogue Challenge" from the Order of Rapscallions. Upon his presentation of his "Rogue Challenge" report at a "Rogues' Dinner," the Rogue is elevated to Rapscallion and becomes a member of the Order of Rapscallions.

Meetings

On the appointed night, members and guests gather for drinks and dinner. Following dinner, the Director signals the opening of the research  presentation portion of the meeting by leading the men in singing "Interesting Thing" the society's theme song, composed by Greg Scheer.

The evening's research presentation fall into one of four categories: Rascal Challenge, Rogue Challenge, Mass Challenge, or Research Report.

In the first two cases, a Rascal Challenge or a Rogue Challenge, one member makes a presentation based upon the challenge he received. As Bob Waite writes in Bucks County Magazine, "A Rascal Challenge is a research project on something that seems insignificant or uninteresting that is made interesting in the presentation before the Lair."  The third case, the Mass Challenge, is a competition in which a single challenge is presented to all members. Each member gives a short presentation in response to the challenge and the best presentation of the night is decided by popular vote. The winner receives the Jonathan Zerse Landgraf medal. For example, the 2003 Mass Challenge in the Doylestown Lair was to invent a patentable device. The winner of that competition, Dr. Michael Moscherosch, invented a device that keeps cigars lit when their owners are not puffing on them. That "device to avoid auto-extinguishing of cigars" was later awarded patent no. 7387129 by the US Patent Office, a patent assigned to the RR&R. In the fourth case, the Research Reports, all members of the group make brief, informal presentations on their current research interests.

After the research presentations are made, the Director leads the men in singing "My Last Cigar," a song attributed to James Maurice Hubbard, and the Keeper of the Humidor provides cigars to all the smokers and the remainder of the evening is spent in smoky conversation.

In addition to regular quarterly meetings, which are for men only, lairs meet annually for a ball, to which women are welcome, and at which presentations of the Landgraf medal and Rascal 'o the Year trophy are made.

Awards

Since 1996, the Jonathan Zerse Landgraf medal has been presented annually for the winner of each Lair's Mass Challenge competition. First-time winners received the medal in bronze; two-time winners have their medal silver-plated; three-time winners have their medal gold-plated; and each subsequent win is marked with the addition of a star on the ribbon.  The award is a memorial in honor of an early member of the society. As of October 2021, a total of 21 medals have been awarded.

The Rascal o' the Year trophy is presented annual in each Lair to the individual who most exemplifies the qualities of the society, as determined by popular vote.

Beer
In 2023, the Ephorate of the Rascals, Rogues, and Rapscallion licensed the name "Rascals, Rogues, and Rapscallions" to the Van Lieu's Brewing Company of Perkasie, Pennsylvania.  Rascals, Rogues, and Rapscallion, a hazy New England style double IPA made with Weyermann Carafoam barley and Simpsons Caramalt malt and Mosaic and Citra hops, is available on tap at a number of restaurants and taverns in eastern Pennsylvania.

Cigars
Cigars are a regular part of all RR&R meetings. In the early days of the society, public restaurants had rooms set aside for parties that wished to smoke. Since that time, however, increasingly restrictive legislation has driven the RR&R from public restaurants to private clubs, such as the Moose Lodge or the Maennerchor Society, where smoking is permitted.

Each Lair elects a Keeper of the Humidor who provides unusual cigars at each meeting.

Each meeting closes with a singing of "My Last Cigar," a sentimental ballad popular in the late 19th century. This ballad, and its author/composer, has been the subject of considerable RR&R research, including, most recently, "Second-Hand Smoke: James Maurice Hubbard and the Search for the Elusive Author and Composer of America’s Second Favorite Song" by Daniel Paul Morrison.

Pennsylvania State Poet Samuel John Hazo wrote and presented "When the Evening Gets Down to Cigars" to the RR&R at the December 4, 1993 meeting of the Pittsburgh Lair, a meeting dedicated to the life and times of Moses F. Gale, the inventor of a gas-fired cigar lighter.

Scholarly Publishing
Since 2001, the Doylestown Lair has published scholarly papers under the moniker Occasional Papers of The Doylestown Institute.  While not every presentation at an RR&R quarterly meeting warrants publication, some presentations are important enough to call for a more permanent record and distribution to research libraries and historical societies.  All responses to Rogue Challenges require publication in Occasional Papers of the Doylestown Institute.

References

External links
 The Ephorate of the Rascals, Rogues, and Rapscallions
 Van Lieus Brewing Company

Fraternities